Everything Will Be Fine is a 2010 Danish film directed by Christoffer Boe, who also wrote the screenplay. The film was screened at the 2010 Cannes Film Festival.

Cast
Jens Albinus as Falk 
Marijana Janković as Helena
Paprika Steen as Siri
Nicolas Bro as Håkon
Søren Malling as Karl
Henning Moritzen as Lemmy

Reception
Boyd van Hoeij of Variety called the film, "[the] most slickly commercial pic yet".

References

External links
Official Website

Danish thriller drama films
2010s Danish-language films
Films directed by Christoffer Boe